The year 1850 was the 69th year of the Rattanakosin Kingdom of Siam (now known as Thailand). It was the twenty-seventh year in the reign of King Rama III.

Incumbents
 Monarch: Rama III
 Supreme Patriarch: Ariyavangsayana (Nag)

Events
 March – Mission led by Joseph Balestier on behalf of the United States of America arrives in Bangkok to discuss trade and diplomatic treaties, mission fails to achieve anything.

 August – Mission led by James Brooke on behalf of the United Kingdom of Great Britain and Ireland arrives in Bangkok to discuss a new and more favourable trade treaty, mission fails to achieve anything.

Births

Deaths

References

 
1850s in Siam
Years of the 19th century in Siam
Siam
Siam